Quercus fulva is a Mexican species of oak tree. It is native to northern and western Mexico, found in Sinaloa, Durango, Nayarit, Chihuahua, and Coahuila.

Description
Quercus fulva is a tree up to 10 meters tall with a trunk as much as 30 cm in diameter.

References

fulva
Endemic oaks of Mexico
Flora of Chihuahua (state)
Flora of Coahuila
Flora of Durango
Flora of Nayarit
Flora of Sinaloa
Least concern flora of North America
Plants described in 1854
Flora of the Sierra Madre Occidental
Taxonomy articles created by Polbot